David D. Cheney was a member of the Wisconsin State Assembly.

Biography
The son of a Free Will Baptist minister and his wife, Cheney was born on January 19, 1822, in Monroe County, Wisconsin. He became involved in various businesses, including the lumber industry. Cheney died on February 16, 1904, in Biloxi, Mississippi.

His son, David W. Cheney, also was elected and served as a member of the Assembly. He also belonged to the Republican Party.

Political career
Cheney was a member of the Wisconsin State Assembly during the 1871 session. He had served as elected president and village treasurer of Sparta, Wisconsin, prior to its incorporation as a city. He also served as a member of the Sparta school board, and chaired the county board of Monroe County, Wisconsin. Cheney was a Republican.

References

People from Sparta, Wisconsin
Republican Party members of the Wisconsin State Assembly
County supervisors in Wisconsin
Mayors of places in Wisconsin
School board members in Wisconsin
Businesspeople from Wisconsin
Businesspeople in timber
1822 births
1904 deaths
19th-century American politicians
19th-century American businesspeople